Max Wieczorek (born 28 April 1939) is a Canadian rower. He competed in the men's eight event at the 1964 Summer Olympics.

References

1939 births
Living people
Canadian male rowers
Olympic rowers of Canada
Rowers at the 1964 Summer Olympics
Place of birth missing (living people)